is a Japanese professional wrestler, retired mixed martial artist and promoter. Ishikawa is known for his violent shoot-style matches, that often include him and his opponents legitimately hitting each other and ending the match with numerous injuries and/or blood on their faces. He is perhaps best known for his work in Battlarts, a promotion he founded in 1996. Ishikawa has also competed extensively on the Japanese independent circuit as a freelancer, competing for companies such as Pro Wrestling Zero1, All Japan Pro Wrestling (AJPW) and Inoki Genome Federation (IGF) as a freelancer.

Professional wrestling career

Pro Wrestling Fujiwara Gumi (1992–1995) 
Ishikawa idolised Antonio Inoki as a child and dreamed of being a professional wrestler his entire life. After graduating from Nihon University, he travelled to the United States and enrolled in Boris Malenko's school of professional wrestling, where he trained under Malenko and Karl Gotch. After returning to Japan in 1991, Ishikawa joined Pro Wrestling Fujiwara Gumi and received further training from owner Yoshiaki Fujiwara. Ishikawa spent the early years of his career in both PWFG and New Japan Pro-Wrestling, where he took part in the 1995 Young Lions Cup but failed to win. On November 19, 1995, after discovering that the sponsors of Fujiwara Gumi planned to massively restructure the roster and change the landscape of the entire promotion, Ishikawa led an exodus which resulted in the entire roster except for Fujiwara himself leaving the promotion.

Battlarts (1996–2002) 

After breaking away from PWFG, Ishikawa announced the formation of his own promotion, Battlarts, set to follow the same shoot style rules and themes of PWFG. As well as using the entirety of the former Fujiwara Gumi roster, Battlarts would make use of fellow independent promotions such as Frontier Martial Arts Wrestling (FMW), Michinoku Pro Wrestling and Big Japan Pro Wrestling (BJW). Battlarts quickly gained notoriety for its violent matches, often ending with Ishikawa either breaking his nose or having blood coming out of his mouth. In 1998, Ishikawa entered the Young Generation Battle, where he would go on to win the tournament by defeating Victor Krüger in the final. In November of the same year he also won the 1998 B Cup, beating Bob Backlund to win. He once again made it to the final of the Young Generation Battle in 1999, however this time he lost to his biggest rival Daisuke Ikeda. Ikeda eventually left Battlarts for All Japan Pro Wrestling (AJPW) in March 2000, and the promotion ceased running regular shows and events in 2001 due to "management aggravation". Battlarts eventually began to run monthly shows mainly in Tokyo, Saitama, and Shizuoka Prefecture, often co-promoting with other promotions such as Kiyoshi Tamura's Style-E and Satoru Sayama's Real Japan Pro Wrestling (RJPW).

Freelance (2001–present) 

As Battlarts ran shows less often, Ishikawa began competing for other promotions in early 2002, working for a number of promotions including Fighting World of Japan Pro Wrestling (WJ), Pro Wrestling Zero1, All Japan Pro Wrestling (AJPW), Riki-Pro and U-Style. On April 24, 2005, Ishikawa took part in an infamous match with Daisuke Ikeda in his Futen promotion, where the two willingly shot on each other, punching and kicking themselves for real. Ishikawa continued to compete semi-regularly for both Battlarts and Futen until they closed their doors in 2011 and 2013 respectively.

Mixed martial arts career 

With a background in judo and karate, Ishikawa made his mixed martial arts debut on November 3, 2001 at Pride 17, losing to Quinton Jackson by knockout. He would compete one more time at Deep 7th Impact, losing to Yasuhito Namekawa by submission.

Mixed martial arts record 

|-
|Loss
|align=center| 2–0
|
|Submission (punches)
|Deep 7th Impact
|
|align=center| 1
|align=center| 3:46
|Tokyo, Japan
|
|-
|Loss
|align=center| 1–0
|
|TKO
|Pride 17
|
|align=center| 1
|align=center| 1:52
|Tokyo, Japan
|

Championships and accomplishments 
Pro Wrestling Zero1
NWA Intercontinental Tag Team Championship (one time) – with Shinjiro Otani

References

Living people
1967 births
Japanese male professional wrestlers